Barabad (also Romanized as Barābād and Borābād) is a village in Pain Khaf Rural District, Sangan District, Khaf County, Razavi Khorasan Province, Iran. At the 2006 census, its population was 3,501, in 782 families.

See also 

 List of cities, towns and villages in Razavi Khorasan Province

References 

Populated places in Khaf County